The Council for European Studies (CES),  based at Columbia University, is an academic organization for the study of Europe. It offers scholarships and research grants, publications, and an annual conference.

History
The Council for European Studies was founded in 1970 with a grant from the Ford Foundation.  First located at the University of Pittsburgh and later moved to Columbia University, its current institutional host, CES was originally formed as a limited consortium of Western European studies programs at eight major U.S. universities: University of California Berkeley, Columbia University, Harvard, Princeton, Massachusetts Institute of Technology, University of Michigan, University of Wisconsin, and Yale.  However, it ceased to be a consortium of eight in 1972, when twenty other universities were invited to become institutional members.

Since that time, its institutional membership has grown substantially.  Its institutional members currently include over 100 universities, colleges, and institutes around the world. Moreover, although membership was once restricted to institutions, CES has opened its membership rolls to individuals and now counts about 1,200 individuals as organization members. Membership provides access to the full range of CES fellowship and award competitions, publications, research resources, and professional development opportunities.

The Council for European Studies is an independent, 501(c)(3) not-for-profit organization.

Grants, Fellowships, and Awards
CES sponsors a variety of fellowship and award competitions for graduate students and scholars of European Studies, which are available exclusively to individual CES members, as well as students, faculty, and researchers affiliated with CES member institutions.
 Mellon-CES Dissertation Completion Fellowships
 Alliance-CES Pre-Dissertation Research Fellowships 
 Harriman-CES Pre-Dissertation Research Fellowships
 SAE-CES Pre-Dissertation Research Fellowships 
 European Studies First Book Award
 European Studies First Article Prizes
 Conference Travel Grants

International Conference of Europeanists
The Council for European Studies hosts an annual conference.

Publications
CES is a leading publisher of research on Europe. The organization's publications include:
 EuropeNow
 Perspectives on Europe
 Reviews & Critical Commentary (CritCom)
 European Studies Newsletter

Former publications
 CES Resource Guide

Research networks
The following research networks are currently supported by the Council for European Studies:
 Business in Politics and Society
 Critical European Studies
 European Culture
 European Integration and the Global Political Economy – New Directions
 Gender and Sexuality
 Health & Wellbeing
 Historical Study of States and Regimes
 Immigration
 Law
 Political Economy and Welfare
 Political Parties, Party Systems and Elections
 Race and Racism in Europe
 Radicalism and Violence
 Social Movements
 Territorial Politics and Federalism
 Transnational Memory and Identity in Europe

References

External links
Official website
Facebook
Twitter
Reviews and Critical Commentary

References

European studies
Columbia University